The 1987 Vuelta a Murcia was the third edition of the Vuelta a Murcia cycle race and was held on 3 March to 8 March 1987. The race started in Águilas and finished in Murcia. The race was won by Pello Ruiz Cabestany.

General classification

References

1987
1987 in road cycling
1987 in Spanish sport